This list details banned movies that are not allowed to be shown in cinemas, TV stations, or on the Internet in China because they are accused by the government of the People's Republic of China of violating relevant laws and regulations, or because of other political factors.

Article 24 of China's "Regulations on the Administration of Movies" stipulates that "films that have not been censored by the film censorship agency of the State Council's administrative department of radio, film and television (hereinafter referred to as the film censorship agency) shall not be distributed, shown, imported or exported.

Definition
The following is as broad a definition of a prohibited film as possible, and one of the following definitions is considered a prohibited work.

 Illegal films are defined in Interpretation of Regulations on the Administration of Movies as "films that have not been approved for public exhibition by the competent state administrative authorities," or "banned films" in the common sense. Such films have not been censored or have skipped censorship, such as being entered into overseas film festivals without being submitted for review, or having illegal content or process.
 In 1994, the Ministry of Radio, Film and Television issued the "Notice on the Prohibition of Supporting and Assisting Zhang Yuan and Others to Make Films and Post-Processing", in which the illegal films mentioned in the file were marked as XXX. This was a ban on the production of films by drama groups; or the media used XX as the name of the film instead.
 Zhang Xianmin, "The History of Banned Films in Mainland China after 90": Banned film, is a title. A prohibited film. The range of prohibited actions are as follows.

 Prohibition of filming
 Prohibition of distribution
 Prohibition of publicity
 Prohibition of the person concerned to continue working in the film industry, etc.

Banned films

1949－1995
After the founding of the People's Republic of China, the Chinese film industry was reconstructed after the Soviet system, and the film production and distribution system was implemented in a "government-enterprise" manner, producing and distributing films according to administrative directives. After the films were produced, they were censored by the Film Office or a higher state agency, and the films that passed the censorship were acquired by government-run distribution and projection companies for nationwide distribution and screening.

1996－2001
During this period, the "Regulations on the Administration of Movies" began to be implemented. In addition to the fact that the production unit must review itself before submitting it for review, it must also submit it to the State Administration of Radio, Film and Television (SARFT) for the filing. Films that have been shot or imported from foreign countries will all be submitted for review, and only after approval can a "Film Public Screening Permit" be obtained. Chinese films are shown in gray background and ordered chronologically.

2002－2017
The new version of the Regulations on the Administration of Movies, which came into effect on February 1, 2002, adding prohibited content, and added a detailed and lengthy explanation for this in the Interpretation of the Film Management Regulations. Chinese films are shown in gray background. Sorted chronologically.

After 2018
After 2018, the Central Committee of the Chinese Communist Party (CCP) issued the Plan for Deepening the Reform of Party and State Institutions. In order to reflect the basic characteristics of socialism with Chinese characteristics, the film work of the SAPPRFT was handed over to the Central Propaganda Department for unified management, and the China Film Administration (CFA) was formally established.

Unbanned films

See also 
Film censorship in China

References

Censored films
Film censorship in China
Lists of banned films